The National Radio Club (frequently abbreviated "NRC") is a non-profit hobbyist organization formed in 1933, via the amalgamation of several regional radio clubs. It is devoted to the activity of DX'ing on the AM broadcast band.

The NRC publishes a printed magazine, "DX News" 20 times per year, and has published numerous books and radio station directories. In 1985, "DX Audio Service", an audio cassette version of the newsletter with some additional content, was launched to serve the large number of visually impaired DX enthusiasts but was discontinued in 2014. In 2005, the club created an on-line site (http://e-dxn. com) which made "DX News" available for download to subscribers. Other forums on the site are available to all DX'ers, but most forums containing columns from DX News are accessible only to NRC members.

The club holds an annual convention, usually in late summer, in a different American city each year, hosted by one or more of the members.

External links

National Radio Club
National Radio Club On-Line
DX News collection, the official bulletin of the National Radio Club at the University of Maryland Libraries

Radio organizations in the United States